Old Soldiers Never Die is a 1931 British comedy film directed by Monty Banks and starring Leslie Fuller, Molly Lamont and Alf Goddard. It was made at Elstree Studios by British International Pictures. It was produced as a quota quickie for release as a second feature.

Cast
 Leslie Fuller as Bill Smith  
 Max Nesbitt as Sam Silverstein  
 Alf Goddard as Sergeant  
 Molly Lamont as Ada  
 Mamie Holland as Jane  
 Wellington Briggs as Colonel  
 Wilfred Shine as Padre  
 Nigel Barrie as Doctor 
 Harry Nesbitt as Harry Silverstein  
 Hal Gordon as Recruit

References

Bibliography
 Chibnall, Steve. Quota Quickies: The Birth of the British 'B' Film. British Film Institute, 2007.
 Low, Rachael. Filmmaking in 1930s Britain. George Allen & Unwin, 1985.
 Wood, Linda. British Films, 1927-1939. British Film Institute, 1986.

External links

1931 films
British comedy films
1931 comedy films
1930s English-language films
Films shot at British International Pictures Studios
Films directed by Monty Banks
British black-and-white films
Quota quickies
1930s British films